Barry Clark (born 30 July 1982) is a British rally driver born in Aberdeen in Scotland. In 2006 he struck driver Jörg Bastuck during the Rally of Catalunya, which shortly after led to Bastuck's demise. After becoming the Fiesta Sporting Trophy International champion in 2007, Clark has been awarded a drive in the World Rally Championship for one event, and secured funding for two more events. His first event was to be in Turkey driving a Ford Focus WRC for the Munchi's Ford team, but after regular Munchi's driver Luís Pérez Companc had to drop out of the Jordan rally, Clark took his place at short notice.  Clark also helps organise his local event, the Speyside Stages organised by 63 car club.

Despite competing in four WRC events in 2008, he was unable to secure sponsorship to enable him to continue at that level and he more or less retired from the WRC. He now runs a successful rally car preparation business in Kintore, Aberdeenshire.

Complete WRC results

References

External links 
 
 Results history at eWRC-results.com

Scottish rally drivers
World Rally Championship drivers
Living people
1982 births
Sportspeople from Aberdeen

M-Sport drivers